Culina or Kulina (also Culino, Kulino) may refer to:

the Culina-Madijá language of the Arawán family
the Kulina language of Curuça, one of the Culina-Pano languages
the Olivença Kulina language, a Panoan language of Brazil
Conibo language, spoken in Brazil and Peru, an official language of Peru

See also 
Korina (disambiguation)
Culina (disambiguation)